Government Post Graduate College (GPGC), Mansehra  is public sector college located in Mansehra of Khyber Pakhtunkhwa in Pakistan. The college offers programs for intermediate level both in Arts and Science groups for which it is affiliated with Board of Intermediate and Secondary Education Abbottabad. The college also offers 4 years BS programs in various disciplines for which it is affiliated with Hazara University.

Overview and history 
Government Post Graduate College, Mansehra is situated at Mansehra city. It was started as Intermediate college in 1958 in a small building. It became degree college in 1973 while it was upgraded to Postgraduate college in 1989. In 2010, GPGC Mansehra started 4 Years BS Programs in 6 science subjects; Physics, Chemistry, Botany, Statistics, Zoology and Maths and 6 social science subjects; English, Urdu, Islamic Studies, Pakistan Studies, Political Science, and Economics.

See also  
 Hazara University
 Government Degree College, Battagram

External links 
 Government Post Graduate College Mansehra Official Website
 Higher Education Department (HED) College Website

References 

Public universities and colleges in Khyber Pakhtunkhwa
Mansehra District